Salem is the most populous town in Montserrat, a British overseas territory in the West Indies, situated on the western coast of the island, in St Peter Parish.

Salem was evacuated after the 1997 volcanic eruptions on the island but has since been resettled.

Education
The Montserrat government operates Salem Daycare and Salem Nursery.

The island's only pre-16 years of age secondary school, the government-operated Montserrat Secondary School (MSS), is in Salem. Montserrat Community College (MCC) is a post-16 and tertiary educational institution in Salem.

In the pre-1997 period it was served by Salem Primary School, and Salem Junior Secondary School.

See also
St. Martin de Porres Church, Salem

References

 
Populated places in Montserrat